Brighton High School may refer to:

Australia
Brighton Secondary College (formerly Brighton High School) in suburban Melbourne
Brighton Secondary School (formerly Brighton High School) in suburban Adelaide

England
Brighton and Hove High School
Brighton College, day and boarding school

United States
Brighton High School (Brighton, Colorado)
Brighton High School (Brighton, Massachusetts)
Brighton High School (Brighton, Michigan)
Brighton High School (Rochester, New York)
Brighton High School (Brighton, Tennessee)
Brighton High School (Cottonwood Heights, Utah)

See also
 Brighton School (disambiguation)
 Brighton College (disambiguation)
 Brighton (disambiguation)